Meshkin or Meshgin or Moshgin or Moshkin or Mushkin may refer to:

Meshgin Shahr County, in Ardabil province
Meshgin-e Sharqi District, in Ardabil province
Meshgin-e Gharbi Rural District, in Ardabil province
Meshgin-e Sharqi Rural District, in Ardabil province
Meshginshahr, a city in Ardabil province
Meshkin, Qazvin
Meshkin, Zanjan

See also
Meshkin Dasht
Meshkin Deh
Meshkin Shahr
Meshkin Tappeh